Howard J. Brewington (born December 3, 1952 in South Carolina) is an American comet discoverer and former professional telescope operator of the Sloan Digital Sky Survey.

Biography
As an amateur astronomer, Brewington visually discovered or co-discovered five comets while manually sweeping the night sky with his home-built reflecting telescopes.  He specifically designed his telescopes for the task, which included hand-grinding and polishing the 8 and 16-inch primary mirrors himself.   Brewington found his first comet from South Carolina in 1989.  To improve his chances of additional finds, he moved to southern New Mexico in the fall of 1990 and built a comet hunting observatory on a mountain ridge east of Cloudcroft.  From 1991 to 1996, the relocation paid-off with four more visual discoveries.  Two of his New Mexico comets, 97P/Metcalf-Brewington and 154P/Brewington, have short-period orbits of about ten years.

Starting in 1992, NASA-funded robotic telescopes had begun finding comets as part of their Near-Earth Object (NEO) survey. Because of this development, Brewington predicted the end of visual comet discoveries and wrote about it in the Summer 1995 issue of CCD Astronomy magazine in an article titled "The Future of Comet Hunting."  A follow-up article by Brewington was published via Sky & Telescope magazine in November 2015, "The Last Visual Comet Hunters," which confirmed his prediction.

Since NASA's automated patrol scopes left few remaining prospects for visual comet hunters, Brewington stopped comet hunting in 1999, moved back to South Carolina, and enrolled at the University of South Carolina in Columbia.  He graduated with honors in the summer of 2002 and was hired by year's end as a 2.5-meter telescope operator through the Astronomy Department of New Mexico State University. From 2002 to 2015, he worked at the Apache Point Observatory in Sunspot, New Mexico as part of the Sloan Digital Sky Survey. During Sloan projects SDSS-I through SDSS-IV, Brewington collected imaging and/or spectral data for projects including First-Phase Operations, Sloan Legacy Survey, SEGUE, Sloan Supernova Survey, APOGEE, BOSS, MARVELS, SEGUE-2, APOGEE-2, eBOSS, and MaNGA.

Brewington, now retired from NMSU, lives in Las Cruces, New Mexico with his second wife, Maria (aka Maya). He is a member of the Astronomical Society of Las Cruces and often attends national star parties.  Brewington also enjoys amateur radio.  He's earned an Amateur Extra class license, and his call sign is KJ5NJ.

Awards
 1990, The South Carolina State Senate  recognized Brewington's 1989 co-discovery of Comet Aarseth-Brewington with a Concurrent Resolution 
 1995, Asteroid (5799) was named "Brewington" in his honor
 1998, received the annual Lone Stargazer Award at the Texas Star Party in Fort Davis
 2001, Brewington was awarded the Order of the Palmetto per South Carolina governor, Jim Hodges 
 2002, became a member of the Phi Beta Kappa Honor Society at USC

See also
Joel Hastings Metcalf
Lists of Comets
Charles Messier

References

External links
Periodic Comet Numbers
Comet 97P/Metcalf-Brewington
Comet 154P/Brewington
Comet C/1996 N1 (Brewington)

Discoverers of comets
American astronomers
People from Las Cruces, New Mexico
1952 births
Living people
University of South Carolina alumni
Amateur radio people